Featherstone is a town in West Yorkshire, England.

Featherstone may also refer to:

Places
in England
Featherstone, Northumberland, village
Featherstone Castle
Featherstone, Staffordshire, village
HM Prison Featherstone
in the United States
Featherstone Township, Minnesota
Featherstone, Virginia
in Zimbabwe
Featherstone, Zimbabwe

Sports clubs
Featherstone Rovers, professional rugby league club from Featherstone, West Yorkshire
Featherstone Lions, amateur rugby league club from Featherstone, West Yorkshire

People 
Featherstone (surname), people with the surname

Other uses
Featherstone (rock band)
Featherstone High School, Southall, London, England
Featherstone Education, an imprint of Bloomsbury Publishing
Featherstone's algorithm, a technique used for computing the effects of forces applied to a structure of joints and links

See also
Featherston